Hans Edgar Paulsen (born 23 April 1946) is a Norwegian footballer. He played in four matches for the Norway national football team from 1970 to 1973.

References

External links
 

1946 births
Living people
Norwegian footballers
Norway international footballers
Place of birth missing (living people)
Association footballers not categorized by position